21 & 22 Vict. c.48 (informally called the Oaths Bill; long title "An Act to substitute One Oath for the Oaths of Allegiance, Supremacy, and Abjuration; and for the Relief of Her Majesty's Subjects professing the Jewish Religion") was an 1858 Act of the UK Parliament which replaced three separate oaths of office with a single oath of allegiance to the British monarch. Besides an oath of allegiance, those holding public office had previously been required to take the Oath of Supremacy (recognising the monarch as Supreme Governor of the Church of England) and the Oath of Abjuration (opposing Jacobitism).

The 1858 act had special provisions for British Jews and Quakers but did not apply to Roman Catholics MPs, for whom the Roman Catholic Relief Act 1829 still applied. The act was passed at the same time as the Jews Relief Act 1858 (21 & 22 Vict. c.49), which removed other civic disabilities. An 1859 amendment (22 Vict. c.10) replaced the wording of the Quaker affirmation. The Parliamentary Oaths Act 1866 (29 & 30 Vict. c.19) changed the oath for legislators taking seats in the Commons or Lords.

The 1858 and 1859 acts were repealed and replaced by the Promissory Oaths Act 1871 (34 & 35 Vict. c. 48).

References
Primary
 21 & 22 Vict. c.48 and c.49
 22 Vict. c.10
 Parliamentary Oaths Act 1866
 Promissory Oaths Act 1871, Schedule 1 Part 1
Secondary
 
 

Oaths of allegiance
Repealed United Kingdom Acts of Parliament
United Kingdom Acts of Parliament 1858
Jewish British history
Quakerism in the United Kingdom
Law about religion in the United Kingdom